Adobogiona (fl. c. 70 BC – c. 30 BC) was an illegitimate daughter of king Mithridates VI of Pontus. Her mother was the Galatian princess Adobogiona the Elder. After the death of her father, Adobogiona married the noble Castor Saecondarius, tetrach of all Galatians from 41/40 to 37/36 BC. Their son Deiotarus Philadelphus became the last king of Paphlagonia at some point before 31 BC and ruled until his death around AD 6.

References
Ton Derks/Nico Roymans, Ethnic Constructs in Antiquity: The Role of Power and Tradition, Amsterdam: Amsterdam University Press, 2009, p. 137.

Galatian people
1st-century BC Iranian people
Iranian people of Greek descent
1st-century BC women
70s BC births
Ancient princesses
Ancient Persian women
People of the Kingdom of Pontus
Mithridatic dynasty